Isethionic acid is an organosulfur compound containing an alkylsulfonic acid located beta to a hydroxy group. Its discovery is generally attributed to Heinrich Gustav Magnus, who prepared it by the action of solid sulfur trioxide on ethanol in 1833.
It is a white water-soluble solid used in the manufacture of certain surfactants and in the industrial production of taurine. It is most commonly available in the form of its sodium salt (sodium isethionate).

Synthesis
Its original synthesis, by the reaction of sulfur trioxide on ethanol, has largely been surpassed. It may be produced by the hydrolysis of carbyl sulfate, which is obtained by the sulfonation of ethylene.

However the most common route is the reaction of ethylene oxide with aqueous sodium bisulfite, which produces the sodium salt (sodium isethionate):

Reactions
Isethionic acid is used as a starting material in the industrial production of taurine.

Dehydration of isethionic acid gives vinylsulfonic acid.

Derivatives
Fatty acid esters of isethionic acid (such as sodium lauroyl isethionate and sodium cocoyl isethionate) are used as biodegradable anionic surfactants. These materials are much milder to skin that other sulfate based surfactants (i.e. sodium lauryl sulfate) making them popular for use in make-up, shampoos and detergent bars including those made by Dove.

Isethionic acid  is also used as a counter ion in certain pharmaceutical formulations, including the antimicrobials hexamidine and pentamidine.

Biological importance
Studies made on dog heart slices suggested that heart tissue may be capable of converting taurine to isethionic acid, further experiments demonstrated that this tissue may synthesize taurine from cystine.

See also
 1,3-Propane sultone

References

Sulfonic acids
Primary alcohols